The Quartermaster Formation is a geologic formation in Texas. It preserves fossils dating back to the Permian period.

See also 
 List of fossiliferous stratigraphic units in Texas
 Paleontology in Texas

References

Further reading 
 R. Roth, N.D. Newell, and B.H. Burma. 1941. Permian pelecypods in the lower Quartermaster Formation, Texas. Journal of Paleontology 15(3):312-317

Permian System of North America
Permian geology of Texas
Changhsingian
Dolomite formations
Tidal deposits
Permian northern paleotropical deposits
Paleontology in Texas